Woodard Family Rural Historic District is a national historic district located near Wilson, Wilson County, North Carolina.  It encompasses 29 contributing buildings in a rural area near Wilson.  The district developed between 1830 and 1911 and includes notable examples of Colonial Revival and Greek Revival style architecture. Notable buildings include the William Woodard House (c. 1832), the Woodard House (c. 1855), William Woodard Jr. House (c. 1850), and Elder William Woodard Sr. House (c. 1880, 1911).

It was listed on the National Register of Historic Places in 1986.

References

Historic districts on the National Register of Historic Places in North Carolina
Colonial Revival architecture in North Carolina
Greek Revival houses in North Carolina
Geography of Wilson County, North Carolina
National Register of Historic Places in Wilson County, North Carolina